Strange Kicks is the third studio album by English post-punk band Alternative TV, released in 1981 by I.R.S. Records. The album showed a shift towards a more new wave style, whilst keeping with the band's non-commercial ethos.

Recording 

Strange Kicks was recorded at Matrix Recording Studios in London, England in April 1981.

Reception 

Dean McFarlane of AllMusic wrote the album "fall[s] a little flat amidst the confusion and veer[s] closer to the new wave sound than most punks would dare to venture." Trouser Press called the album "a different proposition altogether", calling it a "snappy romp through an assortment of styles (ska, pop-punk, even electro-dance)".

Track listing

Personnel 
 Alternative TV

 Mark Perry – vocals
 Alex Ferguson – guitar
 Alan Gruner – keyboards
 Dennis Burns – bass guitar
 Ray Weston – drums

 Additional personnel

 Richard Mazda – guitar, percussion, backing vocals, production
 Dee Dee Thorne – vocals on track B3
 Brian James – guitar on track B3

 Technical

 Jesse Sutcliffe – engineering
 X3 Posters – cover art
 Barbarann Reeves – sleeve design
 Watal Asanuma – back cover photography
 Flash Gunn – front cover photography

References

External links 

 

Alternative TV albums
1981 albums
I.R.S. Records albums
Illegal Records albums
Albums produced by Richard Mazda